Liawenee is a small town in Tasmania, Australia built near Great Lake and the River Ouse, and was established on 11 June 1920. The town is an ex-Hydro village and now a residence for Inland Fisheries Services (IFS) and a Tasmania Police station. It is known for its exceptional fishing at nearby Great Lake and hosts several trout fishing events.

Liawenee is the coldest permanently-inhabited place in Australia.

In January 2020, Liawenee’s population doubled to two, that being the police officer and an Inland Fisheries Service (IFS) officer now stationed permanently in the town.

Origins

Liawenee's name was derived from a Tasmanian Aboriginal word meaning "frigid". It was founded in June 1920 as a camp for the workers at the nearby hydroelectric undertaking as well as some other towns such as Miena. In its humble beginnings, the population consisted entirely of the workers at the hydroelectric plant and their families; the houses were wood and canvas. In this time, the camp boasted three cottages where married couples lived, and a so-called hospital that was only twice the size of a house, making it more of a first-aid clinic. The original layout included blacksmiths, bakeries and a chaff store which made up the requirements for a workforce making it a work camp rather than a village. During the Second World War the town became much larger, but settlers consisted mainly of men who were paid for their work yet could find no place to spend the money, nor a place to deliver mail.

The first Liawenee Post Office opened on 1 October 1919 and closed in 1922. The second opened on 2 February 1948 but closed in 1953. As of 2022, Liawenee consists of a police station and several small buildings.

Geography
Liawenee is located along the Lake highway among the central Tasmanian mountains. The mountains surrounding Liawenee include Split Rock, Willow Run Hill, Headlam Hill and McDowall Hill, with the latter being the tallest. The rough terrain suits bush-walking and mountain biking, except during winter, and the nearest populated area is  Miena, about 13 km south. The section of the highway to Miena was sealed during 2015.

Climate 
Owing to its high-elevation location in the far south of Australia, Liawenee's climate features the rare cold-summer mediterranean climate (Köppen climate classification: Csc), though it is also on the border between an oceanic climate (Köppen climate classification Cfb) and a subpolar oceanic climate (Köppen climate classification Cfc). Even though summers are cool to mild, occasionally a northerly wind causes temperatures to climb into the mid- to high twenties but rarely into the thirties. The coldest day on record was on 9 July 1997, when the temperature did not rise above . Days below  have been recorded in summer, with the coldest day in summer being , recorded on 3 December 2017. The town spends an annual average of only 0.7 days above  but in contrast spends 210.2 days below , with 142.4 below freezing.

There are about 136 cloudy days a year, which peaks in July at 16 days and drops to an average of 8 days in January. There are about 182 days of measurable precipitation each year. The humidity is high but the lack of warm weather means that it never becomes uncomfortable. The annual mean 9am humidity is 82% and the annual mean 3pm humidity is 67%. Snowfall is frequent and heavy; receiving 41.8 snowy days annually, of which can fall in any month.

However, Mount William in western Victoria at only 1,150 m is just , with colder maxima than Liawenee between May and September. Keoghs Pimple at 831 m, averages .

References 

Towns in Tasmania
Central Highlands (Tasmania)
Localities of Central Highlands Council